<noinclude>
This is a list of airlines currently operating in Zambia (2020):

Passenger airlines

Scheduled

Charter

See also
List of defunct airlines of Zambia
List of airports in Zambia

References

Zambia
Airlines
Airlines
Zambia